In 2008 beer production in Belarus fell by 0.4% to 3.53 mln hl.

A local peculiarity of the Belarusian beer market is a large share of beer in PET and considerable amount of imported production (about 20% of the market). The largest producer is the state-owned company Krinitsa, with a 38% share of national beer production in 2008. Other beer companies with strong market shares include Alivaria (Carlsberg Group), Syabar and Rechitsapivo (Heineken International), Lidskoe Pivo (Olvi) and the state-owned company Brestskoe Pivo.

Major beers in Belarus 

 Alivaryia (Carlsberg Group)
 Bobrov (Heineken International)
 Brovar (Carlsberg Group)
 Desyatka (Carlsberg Group)
 Dvinsky Brovar
 Lidskae (Olvi)
 Rechitskoe (Heineken International)
 Tema (Olvi)

See also

 Beer and breweries by region

References 

 
Beer in Europe